The Tattooist is a 2007 New Zealand horror film directed by Peter Burger and starring Jason Behr, Nathaniel Lees, Michael Hurst and Robbie Magasiva among others. The film is the first in a series of official co-productions between New Zealand and Singapore.

Plot
Jake Sawyer (Jason Behr) is a global wanderer and tattooist who explores ethnic themes in his designs. While visiting Singapore to sell his craft at a local trade show, he swipes an ancient Samoan tattoo tool. After flying to New Zealand to resume his art, he meets up with a lovely Samoan woman named Sina (Mia Blake) and discovers the local Samoan culture. But Jake slowly learns that his stolen tool ends up unleashing an evil avenging spirit whom targets all of the customers that Jake has given tattoos to since his theft of the tool. While attempting to learn pe'a, the Samoan tradition of tattooing, Jake soon realizes that Sina is imperiled when she gets a tattoo from him and he must find a way to save her, and himself.

Cast 
Jason Behr as Jake Sawyer
Timothy Balme as Jake's Father
Michael Hurst as Crash
David Fane as Mr. Va'a
Nathaniel Lees as Mr. Perenese
Mia Blake as Sina
Caroline Cheong as Victoria
Robbie Magasiva as Alipati
Matthew Ridge as Graham
Stuart Devenie as Senior Doctor
Jarred Blakiston as Young Jake Sawyer

Production
Principal photography commenced on 16 September 2006 in Auckland, New Zealand.

Soundtrack
The soundtrack contains music by The Mint Chicks, King Kapisi and Don McGlashan among others. The score is composed by Peter Scholes.

Reception
Critical reception has been mixed to negative for The Tattooist. Common criticism centered on the film's pacing, as reviewers from sites such as DreadCentral felt that the movie's plot was too padded and the concept too thin for the 90-minute film length. Bloody Disgusting echoed the same sentiments and expressed frustration over The Tattooist, as they believed that the movie could have been "something fresh and original but instead mimicked a bunch of terrible films before it." Shock Till You Drop criticized what they saw as an overabundance of backstory and exposition, explaining that "Too much time spent on explaining 'why' works against sustaining a sense of disbelief and The Tattooist is especially ponderous in this regard." In a positive review, David Johnson of DVD Verdict stated the film is "a frantic, messy, nasty little horror flick and is worth checking out."

References

External links 

2007 films
2007 horror films
2000s supernatural horror films
Films set in New Zealand
Films shot in New Zealand
New Zealand horror films
2000s English-language films
Sony Pictures direct-to-video films